Bermuda Street is a road  on the Gold Coast from Bundall to Burleigh Heads in Queensland, Australia. Originally a suburban street, it is now part of Southport – Burleigh Road, a state controlled road (State Route 3)

The highest point of the road is 22 metres at the junction with the Pacific Motorway in Burleigh Heads (Southern End).

Bermuda Street is the southern extension of Bundall Road (a much older thoroughfare) across the Nerang River and through many newer suburbs to the Pacific Motorway at Burleigh Heads. Not all maps agree on the precise point at which the name changes, but the most commonly accepted is at the intersection with Boomerang Crescent, about 300 metres south of the intersection of Bundall Road with Ashmore Road.

Major intersections

  Nerang - Broadbeach Road (west) / Hooker Boulevard (east) (State Route 90)
 Markeri Street
 Cottesloe Drive
 Christine Avenue
  Burleigh Connection Road (State Route 80)

References 

Roads on the Gold Coast, Queensland